Elections to East Ayrshire Council were held on 6 May 1999, alongside elections to the Scottish Parliament. This was the second election following the local government reforms in 1994 and the first following the Third Statutory Reviews of Electoral Arrangements which resulted in two additional seats from the previous election.

Despite losing five seats, Labour maintained a majority on the council winning 17 of the 32 seats. The Scottish National Party (SNP) remained the largest opposition party after gaining six seats to hold 14 while the Conservatives won their first seat in East Ayrshire.

Summary

Source:

Ward results

Stewarton East and Dunlop

Stewarton Central

Kilmaurs and Stewarton South

North Kilmarnock, Fenwick and Waterside

Crosshouse, Gatehead and Knockentiber
Ward 6 was renamed Crosshouse, Gatehead and Knockentiber following the Third Statutory Reviews of Electoral Arrangements. The boundary was unchanged.

Altonhill, Hillhead and Longpark

Onthank

Kilmarnock Central West

Kilmarnock Central East

North New Farm Loch and Dean

South New Farm Loch
Ward 2 was renamed South New Farm Loch following the Third Statutory Reviews of Electoral Arrangements. The boundary was unchanged.

Crookedholm, Moscow, Galston West and Hurlford North
Ward 17 was renamed Crookedholm, Moscow, Galston West and Hurlford North following the Third Statutory Reviews of Electoral Arrangements. There were minor changes to the boundary.

Newmilns

Grange and Howard

Kilmarnock Central South

Riccarton
Ward 10 was renamed Riccarton following the Third Statutory Reviews of Electoral Arrangements. There were small changes to the boundary.

Shortlees
Ward 9 was renamed Shortlees following the Third Statutory Reviews of Electoral Arrangements. There were small changes to the boundary.

Bellfield
Ward 8 was renamed Bellfield following the Third Statutory Reviews of Electoral Arrangements. There were small changes to the boundary.

Hurlford
Ward 16 was renamed Hurlford following the Third Statutory Reviews of Electoral Arrangements. There were no changes to the boundary.

Galston East
Ward 18 was renamed Galston East following the Third Statutory Reviews of Electoral Arrangements. There were minor changes to the boundary.

Darvel

Mauchline

Catrine, Sorn and Mauchline East

Muirkirk, Lugar and Logan
Lugar, Logan and Muirkirk was renamed Muirkirk, Lugar and Logan following the Third Statutory Reviews of Electoral Arrangements. There were no changes to the boundary.

Drongan, Stair and Rankinston

Ochiltree, Skares, Netherthird and Craigens

Auchinleck

Cumnock West

Cumnock East

Patna and Dalrymple

Dalmellington

New Cumnock

References

East Ayrshire
East Ayrshire Council elections